Giambruno is an Italian surname. Notable people with the surname include:

Juan Giambruno (born 1950), Uruguayan surgeon
Marco Giambruno (born 1985), Italian footballer
Mark Giambruno (born 1957), American 3D artist, art director, and writer

Italian-language surnames